The Daniel Payne House is a historic house at 27 Park Avenue in Windsor, Connecticut.  Built about 1830, it is a well-preserved example of a brick house with Greek Revival styling.  It was listed on the National Register of Historic Places in 1988.

Description and history
The Daniel Payne House is located in southern Windsor, on the south side of Park Avenue (Connecticut Route 178), a short way west of its junction with Connecticut Route 159.  It is a two-story brick building, with a low-pitch gabled roof and four interior brick chimneys.  The main facade is four bays wide, with the main entrance in the center-right bay. The entry is sheltered by a Victorian porch with a gabled roof and turned posts. Windows are set in rectangular openings, with narrow brownstone sills and lintels.  A band of brick corbelling extends around the building at the cornice level, giving the side gable ends a pedimented appearance.  A 20th-century garage is located behind the house.

The house was built about 1830.  Its first documented owner was Clarissa Loomis, who sold it in 1855 to Daniel Payne, a farmer.  The house is a well-preserved example of brick houses that were built in larger number in the area.

See also
National Register of Historic Places listings in Windsor, Connecticut

References

Houses on the National Register of Historic Places in Connecticut
National Register of Historic Places in Hartford County, Connecticut
Greek Revival architecture in Connecticut
Houses completed in 1830
Houses in Windsor, Connecticut